The Étang de Crovani is a coastal lagoon beside the Mediterranean Sea on the west coast of the Haute-Corse department on the French island of Corsica.

Location

The Étang de Crovani is on the west coast of Haute-Corse in the commune of Calenzana to the east of the Baie de Crovani.
It is a permanent body of water separated from the sea by a bank of pebbles and gravel.
It is north of the village of L'Argentella and west of the D81b road, which leads to the village of Vignaccia.

The lagoon and surrounding marshes cover .
The main tributary is the  Ruisseau de Marconcellu.

Ecology

The site is owned by the Conservatoire du littoral.
It is classified as a Zone naturelle d'intérêt écologique, faunistique et floristique (ZNIEFF) Continentale de type 1.

The lagoon is surrounded by a belt of tamarix trees and some grasslands dominated by bulrushes and rushes.
The coastal barrier has a dense mosaic of mastic (Pistacia lentiscus) trees.
It does not attract many birds due to its small size, but could be used as a stopover by migrating birds or as a wintering place in very cold winters.
The Köppen climate classification is Csb : Warm-summer Mediterranean climate.

Notes

Citations

Sources

Lagoons of Haute-Corse